Yuromka is a rural locality (a village) in Malyshevskoye Rural Settlement, Selivanovsky District, Vladimir Oblast, Russia. The population was 82 as of 2010.

Geography 
Yuromka is located on the Ushna River, 35 km southwest from Krasnaya Gorbatka (the district's administrative centre) by road. Kostenets is the nearest rural locality.

References 

Rural localities in Selivanovsky District